Solyman Brown (November 17, 1790 – 1876) was an American dentist known for his role in creating the first dental school, the first US National Dental Society and the first US Dental Journal. He was also known as a poet of dentistry.

Personal life and major events
Solyman Brown was born in Litchfield, Connecticut, on November 17, 1790, son of Nathaniel and Thankful Brown. Renowned for being a member of the Society of Surgeon Dentists of New York City and the State of New York, he was also a founder and a member of the American Association of Dental Surgeons. In 1812, he graduated from Yale College, and two years later, he became a licentiate of the Congregational church. For seven years, he exercised his professional responsibilities, being also involved in youth instruction.

Brown worked in several areas. He graduated with the degrees BA, MA, MD, and DDS from Yale University, and subsequently his professional life ensued as a Christian missionary in Connecticut, but disputes with some of the Church leaders led him to a different prominent field. Brown published several books charting his viewpoints on how religion should be portrayed. According to the Journal of the American College of Dentists, Brown was best appreciated for establishing the first dental learning institution in the nineteenth century, the First national Dental Society, and the first dental journal within the United States' boundaries so called the 'American Journal of Dental Science'.  

During his first year in college, a severe illness of the lungs afflicted him. Having been troubled by fragile health and irritation of the bronchia, he was forced almost completely to abandon public speaking to make teaching his full-time career. Brown moved to New York to proceed with his labours as a formal instructor in 1822. Here, he renowned and embraced Emmanuel Swedenborg's doctrines and was constituted a regular preacher of the New Jerusalem Church. Nevertheless, he continued to teach until 1832. Having verified himself in his new career, he married Elizabeth Butler, daughter of Amos Butler, in 1834.

He acted as editor and owner of "The New York Mercantile Advertiser" for several years while making New York City his residence. Having written several articles explaining dental principles and rules, he finally became one of the editors of "The American Journal and Library of Dental science." 

Brown also wrote several poems, articles, and essays and consistently contributed to the periodical press, especially to the lines of "The New York Mirror", before his death in 1876 in Minnesota.

Poetry, books, and writings
Early in his career, Brown resolved to turn his hand to poetry. Best known for "Dentologia, a Poem on the Diseases of the Teeth and their Proper Remedies", he wrote his 80 pages epic poem in 1833. An article researched and complied by Ring discusses the founders of dentistry as a profession, where he argues that this was one of his most noteworthy achievements, which brought him approving reviews from scholars and establishments in America including his critics; his modern literary foundation hails him as the "poet laureate of dentistry". According to Ring, it was a poem that discussed various teeth diseases and their treatment options. This did enough to raise dentistry status within the United States and many other parts of the world.

Many of his poems were about dental ailments and possible prevention, management, and treatment. Portions of them were published in the American Journal of Dental Science which did in fact elucidate the improvement and elevation of his dental professional status.  

Solyman Brown's poetry attracted the majority of the American Society on February 22, 1822, when he was requested to recite the narrative poem, "The Birth of Washington," at Washington Hall in New York City during Natal day celebrations of the United States' first president George Washington. In the same year, he was entrusted to re-recite the same poem on March 4. 

The leading literary journal, The Knickerbocker, published and republished large sections of Brown's poem between 1833 and 1860. In 1838, he published another major work on dentistry, "Dental Hygeia, a Poem on the Health and Preservation of the Teeth" where his main concern was discussing and suggesting the appropriate ways to preserve our teeth, made him receive the title "poet laureate of dentistry." 

Brown's most famous writing was "A Treatise on Mechanical Dentistry". Unluckily, it caused the anger and backlash of some of his associate dentists "for revealing the secrets of the profession". 

The following are some of his other famed titles; 

 The Citizen and Strangers' Pistorial and Business Directory, for the City of New-York and Its Vicinity, 
 Union of Extremes: A Discourse on Liberty and Slavery, as They, Stand Related to the Justice, Prosperity, and Perpetuity of the United Republic of North America.

Achievements and impact in medical field 
Brown was famed for his numerous achievements in different fields, including but not limited to poetry, religion, and most importantly, in the medical field. He participated in the development of dental professionals. He successfully coordinated and organised leading dentists to form the 1st national dental organisation in the world, in which he was the first superintendent and director. He also served as an editor of the first dental journal for two consecutive years, not to mention him authoring many more unpublished writings, some of which were discovered later, after his death, in a trunk full of stuff relating to his life. 

Academically, Brown achieved his dream by graduating and receiving a divinity degree from Yale College at 18 years only. He pursued his inspiration to join the ministry at Litchfield and Yale College, from which he was later certified by their board in 1812. He then served as a clergyman of various churches before moving to New York City in 1822. However, his chronic illness caused his voice to fail and stopped the ministry work due to bronchi infection and resolved to join Eleazar Parmly, a leading member of a prominent dentist's family. He immediately became Parmly's dentist student and proved a skilled practitioner. 

Besides, he was successful in publishing several poems (e.g Dentologia). He was also successful in calling leading dentists across the world in a meeting and influenced them to launch the first national American Society of Dental Surgeons, in 1840.  

In 1839, Solyman Brown urged the Dental Society to build a dental school (which later became Baltimore College of Dental Surgery). Thus, by the efforts of Brown, Harris, Hayden, and Parmly the first US dental school was established. Given that he lived and worked in New York City, he couldn't continue teaching at the new institution. Nevertheless, he helped to shape the school's goals and curriculum. He also led the group to launch the American Journal of Dental Science. 

After 28 years in dental practice, he developed complications with his eyes hence losing proper eyesight, and resolved to start manufacturing synthetic teeth and set a dental supply entity. According to Everest, Brown established the New York Teeth Manufacturing firm to design artificial teeth in larger quantities. The company also published a newsletter, "The Forcep" but this has unfortunately failed in 1860.

Another achievement of Brown was correcting the terrible state of dentistry in the 19th Century. According to Ring, American dentistry was in turmoil during the early years of the nineteenth century. Ring notes that there were no proper statutory standards for treating individuals with dental problems. In Ring's words, "Then several visionary practitioners got together and turned the trade of dentistry into a profession; and foremost among these was Solyman Brown, a giant in dentistry who ranks with Chapin A. Harris and Horace Hayden." At that time, no laws existed regulating training dentists and qualifications before allowed to practice dentistry, given that there was no school of dentistry within and outside the United States. Therefore, practitioners were left to make their decisions concerning the establishment and treatment of dental diseases. This was the time when Brown stepped up to help rectify the worsening situation. Together with many farseeing and ethical dentists, such as Harris, Hayden, and Parmly, these men were informed of the necessity for ethical restrictions in dental practice. 

Brown was also a skilled woodworker and mason who built fine furniture. To quote Ring, "and when his fortunes fell in his middle years, he built his own house with his own two hands." He enlarged his house by adjoining it with a hall between them.

Last days and death 
At the age of 86 in Dodge Centre, Minnesota, Solyman Brown died of pneumonia on 13th Feb 1876, as written by his daughter Augusta.

Before his untimely death, Solyman Brown left a note with the following words; "The truth is that in my present state, I enjoy a great deal and suffer a great deal." He was buried in the state of Minnesota by the organization. A monument was erected on his grave to his memory with bearing;

"Ever his face was set to go Up toward Jerusalem. Ever he lived and walked as though He saw its golden beam".

His wife, Elizabeth, also died seven years later. Together they left behind 84 descendants.

Bibliography

References

 American Council of Learned Societies, 1943. Dictionary of American Biography, Vol. 3
Brown, S., 1833. Dentologia: a poem on the diseases of the teeth, and their proper remedies. 
Brown, S., 1838. Dental hygeia : a poem, on the health and preservation of the teeth. 
Everest, C.W., 1843. The Poets of Connecticut; with biographical sketches. Edited by Rev. C.W.E. 
 Ring, M.E., 2002. Solyman Brown, a giant of dentistry and its poet laureate. Journal of the California Dental Association
 Ring, M.E., 2005. Founders of a profession: the original subscribers to the first dental journal in the world. The Journal of the American College of Dentists
Summer 2005, Journal of the American College of Dentists.

1790 births
1876 deaths
19th-century dentists
American dentists
Yale College alumni